Hotshot or Hotshots or Hot Shot or Hot Shots may refer to:

 Heated shot, a heated projectile fired from a cannon
 Less than truckload shipping, industry jargon for smaller sized equipment that can move freight faster than tractor-trailers
 Hot shot (or hot load), a lethal injection of heroin or another opiate
 Interagency hotshot crew, an elite team of wildland firefighters

Books
 Hotshot, in the Hero Hotline comic series
 Hotshot, in the Starriors comic and toy line

Film and TV

Film
 Hotshot (film), 1987 American soccer film
Hotshots, 1984 Philippines film with Aga Muhlach, Gary Valenciano, Eula Valdez
 Hot Shots (1956 film), a 1956 film starring The Bowery Boys
 Hot Shots!, a 1991 comedy film starring Charlie Sheen
 Hot Shots! Part Deux, a 1993 sequel to the 1991 film

Television 
 Hot Shot (TV series), a 2008 Taiwanese drama Featuring Wu Chun, Show Luo & Jerry Yan
 Hot Shots (Canadian TV series), a Canadian drama series airing in 1986
 Hot Shots (U.S. TV series), an American shooting sports series
 "Hot Shots" (The Wire), a 2003 episode of HBO's The Wire

Games
 Hot Shots Golf (series), the North American name of the video game franchise Everybody's Golf
 HotShot (video game)

Music 
 Hotshot (band) (핫샷) 2014-present, a South Korean boy band 
 Hotshot (1980s-2000s band), band including Mike Pont
 The Hotshots, a 1970s UK male vocal group, performers of the song Snoopy vs. the Red Baron
 Hotshots, a  CD:UK British music programme series

Albums
 Hot Shot (Karen Young album), a 1978 disco/pop album by American  singer Karen Young
 Hot Shot (Shaggy album), a 2000 album by Shaggy
 Hot Shots (album), a 1979 album by Canadian band Trooper

 Hot Shots II, a 2001 album by The Beta Band

Songs
 "Hot Shot" (Barry Blue song), a 1974 song by Barry Blue and Lynsey de Paul
 "Hot Shot" (Karen Young song), a 1978 song by Karen Young
 "Hot Shot" (Cliff Richard song), a 1979 song by Cliff Richard from Rock 'n' Roll Juvenile
 "Hot Shot", a 1985 song by Jimmy Cliff from Cliff Hanger
 "Hot Shot", a 2003 song by Krokus from Rock the Block

Sports
 Arizona Hotshots, a professional American football team based in Tempe, Arizona 
 Hotshot (basketball), a basketball shooting game
 Houston Hotshots, an indoor soccer team in Houston, Texas
 Southern Hotshots, an Australian field hockey team
 West Coast Hotshots, a basketball team based in Bend, Oregon
 Talk 'N Text Tropang Texters, formerly Pepsi Hotshots, a Philippine basketball team

In professional wrestling
 Hotshot (strategy), short-term promotional strategy (of any of several kinds)
 Hotshot (throw), a style of throw
 Reverse hotshot, or reverse hangman, a style of attack

Other uses
 Hot Shot (Transformers), the name of several robot superhero characters in the Transformers robot superhero franchise.
 Hot Shots (dance companies), a collective name for two Swedish dance companies that specialize in African American dances
 Hot Shot Hamish, a character in a British football-themed comic strips
 Hot Shot!, the 2009–10 FIRST Tech Challenge competition
 Ford Hot Shots, a curling competition 
 Hot Shot, the brand name for a line of hot water makers made by Sunbeam Products
 Hot Shot, the brand name for an insecticide using Lambda-cyhalothrin
 Hot shot wind tunnel, for hypersonic testing
 Hotshot (railway), rail terminology for some high-priority trains
 Hotshot crew, a firefighting crew specially trained in wildland firefighting
 Granite Mountain Hotshots, a fire crew in the Prescott, Arizona Fire Department
 Pantech Hotshot, a 3G device manufactured for Verizon
 Okay Hot-Shot, Okay! (1963), a painting by Ray Lichtenstein
 Hotshot Charlie, cartoon series by George Wunder
 Hotshot Eastbound (1956), photo by O. Winston Link